Fernando Santillana Figueroa (died 1574) was a Roman Catholic prelate who served as Bishop-Elect of La Plata o Charcas (1572–1574).

Biography
On 17 October 1572, Fernando Santillana Figueroa was appointed during the papacy of Pope Gregory XIII as Bishop of La Plata o Charcas.
He died before his consecration as Bishop-Elect of La Plata o Charcas in 1574.

References

External links and additional sources
 (for Chronology of Bishops) 
 (for Chronology of Bishops) 

16th-century Roman Catholic bishops in Bolivia
Bishops appointed by Pope Gregory XIII
1574 deaths
Roman Catholic bishops of Sucre